Publius Cloelius Siculus was appointed rex sacrorum in 180 BC, succeeding Gnaeus Cornelius Dolabella. Valerius Maximus says that he was flamen dialis, and that he was compelled to resign because of improperly presented exta ("entrails," as used in the auspices).  The rex sacrorum traditionally held this title until his death; however, the date of Siculus' death is unknown.

See also
 Cloelia gens

References
Unless otherwise noted, dates, offices and citations of ancient sources are from T.R.S. Broughton, The Magistrates of the Roman Republic (American Philological Association, 1951, 1986), vol. 1; vol. 2 (1952); vol. 3 (1986); abbreviated MRR.

2nd-century BC clergy
2nd-century BC Romans
Siculus, Publius
Priests of the Roman Republic